David Montero Petracca (born 16 January 1974) is a German former professional footballer who played as a midfielder.

Career
Montero was born in Stuttgart, West Germany. He spent one season in the Bundesliga with Eintracht Frankfurt. Before 1998 he was known as David Petracca.

References

Living people
1974 births
German people of Spanish descent
German footballers
Spanish footballers
Association football midfielders
SV Waldhof Mannheim players
Eintracht Frankfurt players
Rot-Weiß Oberhausen players
SSV Jahn Regensburg players
SG Sonnenhof Großaspach players
Bundesliga players
2. Bundesliga players
Footballers from Stuttgart